This is a list of listed buildings in Aalborg Municipality, Denmark.

The list

9000 Aalborg

900 Aalborg SV

9230 Svenstrup J

9240 Nibe

9260 Gistrup

9270 Klarup

9280 Storvorde

9293 Kongerslev

9370 Hals

9400 Nørresundby

References

External links

 Danish Agency of Culture

 
Aalborg